Eleven ships of the Royal Navy have borne the name HMS Cruizer or HMS Cruiser:

  was a 24-gun sixth rate, previously the French ship De Meric.  She was captured in 1705 by HMS Tryton and was wrecked in 1708.
  was a 14-gun sloop.  She was previously named Unity, before being purchased in 1709.  She was sold in 1712.
  was an 8-gun sloop captured in 1721 and foundered in 1724.
  was an 8-gun sloop launched in 1721 and broken up in 1731.
  was a 14-gun sloop launched in 1732 and broken up in 1744.
  was an 8-gun  sloop launched in 1752 and burnt in 1776.
  was a 14-gun cutter purchased in 1780 and lost in 1792.
  was the prototype of the 18-gun  brig sloops, to which design 110 vessels were ordered; the prototype was launched in 1797 and sold in 1819.
  was a  launched in 1828, converted to a brig in 1831, back to a ship in 1840 and sold at Bombay in 1849.
  was a  wooden screw sloop launched in 1852. She was renamed HMS Cruiser in 1857, and then converted into a training ship and renamed HMS Lark in 1893. She was sold in 1912.
 HMS Cruizer was a  sloop, previously named .  She had been launched in 1879, renamed HMS Lark in 1892 and HMS Cruizer in 1893.  She was sold in 1919.

References
 

Royal Navy ship names